Student Volunteer Campus Community (abbreviated SVCC, and formerly SVCC Language Schools) is a non-profit organization run by volunteers located in Edmonton, Alberta, Canada and operates at the University of Alberta as a student volunteer group.

History
Originally located at St. Joseph's College on the campus of The University of Alberta, operations moved to the Education Building in 1984 to facilitate expansion of the "Cantonese Language Group"

SVCC Language Schools was founded in 1980 under the name "Student Volunteer Campus Community," by the late Father Firth and Rita Chow.  Originally, SVCC was an English Language School intended for new immigrants from Vietnam and the Orient learning English as a second language.

Those English as a Second Language classes were held at St. Joseph's College, a small college also located on the University of Alberta Campus. When the English Language Group hosted five classes, SVCC relocated to the Education Building on the University Campus, where it continues to operate today.

In 1984, SVCC opened their second language program as the "Cantonese Language Group" for children.

As time went on, SVCC became more well known as its popularity came with the establishment of a Mandarin Language Group (2005), French Language Group (2007), Japanese Language Group (2008) and Korean Language Group (2009), and most recently, a Spanish program in 2013 

In the Fall semester of 2013, SVCC marked its 100th session in operation.

Basic structure
SVCC Language Schools comprises six language schools as well as three operational departments listed as the following:

 Operations (Internal Department)
 Finance
 Marketing (External Department)
 English Language Group
 Cantonese Language Group
 Mandarin Language Group
 French Language Group
 Japanese Language Group
 Korean Language Group
 Spanish Language Group

Mission statement
The objectives of SVCC are:

 To provide participants with an opportunity to experience language in a discussion-like setting
 To integrate volunteer activities as a part of everyday student life at the University
 To develop cooperative learning between participants through peer-education
 To introduce members of the international community to Canadian culture through language education
 To promote multiculturalism and the respect of the variety of cultures in Canada

External links
SVCC Language Schools Website on University of Alberta
SVCC Wiki
SVCC FaceBook Page
University of Alberta

References

Non-profit organizations based in Canada
Organizations based in Edmonton
Educational institutions established in 1980